Elections were held in Central Luzon for seats in the House of Representatives of the Philippines on May 13, 2013.

The candidate with the most votes won that district's seat for the 16th Congress of the Philippines.

Summary

Aurora
Incumbent Juan Edgardo Angara is term limited and is instead running for the Senate. His aunt, Governor Bellaflor Angara-Castillo, is his party's nominee.

Bataan

1st District
Incumbent Herminia Roman is being challenged by Bases Conversion and Development Authority chairman Felicito Payumo; Payumo substituted for Edwin Enrile.

2nd District
Incumbent Albert S. Garcia is term limited; his father Governor Enrique Garcia is his party's nominee. Actor Onemig Bondoc of Aksyon Demokratiko withdrew his candidacy on February 5.

Bulacan

1st District
Ma. Victoria Sy-Alvarado is the incumbent.

2nd District
Incumbent Pedro Pancho is term limited; his son Gavini is his party's nominee.

Independent candidate Pancho Ordanes withdrew his candidacy.

3rd District
Joselito Andrew Mendoza is the incumbent.

4th District
Linabelle Villarica is the incumbent.

San Jose del Monte
Arthur Robes is the incumbent. On early February, the Commission on Elections' Second Division disqualified his primary opponent, singer Imelda Papin for failure of proving her residence in the city; the complaint was filed by Arangkada San Joseno Political Party, which said that she is actually a resident of nearby North Fairview, Quezon City. However, the commission en banc overturned the Second Division's decision, thereby allowing Papin to run.

Nueva Ecija

1st District
Incumbent Josefina Joson is running for the governorship. Her husband Quezon mayor Mariano Cristino Joson is his party's nominee.

2nd District
Incumbent Joseph Gilbert Viologo is running unopposed.

3rd District
Czarina Umali is the Incumbent.

4th District
Incumbent Rodolfo Antonino is term limited ; his daughter Magnolia Antonino-Nadres is his party's nominee.

Pampanga

1st District
Incumbent Carmelo Lazatin is not running instead he is running for mayor of Angeles City, Lakas-CMD thru the local party KAMBILAN nominates basketball coach and incumbent Vice-Governor Yeng Guiao. he will face former Congressman Francis Nepomuceno.

2nd District
Incumbent Gloria Macapagal Arroyo is running despite of her sickness and in hospital arrest.

3rd District
Aurelio Gonzales Jr. is the incumbent. He will be facing-off incumbent San Fernando City Mayor Oscar Rodriguez.

4th District
Incumbent Anna York Bondoc is term limited; her brother Juan Pablo Bondoc is her party's nominee.

Tarlac

1st District
Incumbent Enrique Cojuangco is running unopposed.

2nd District
Susan Sulit is the incumbent.

3rd District
Jeci Lapus is the incumbent, he was defeated by Concepcion mayor Noel Villanueva.

Zambales

1st District
Incumbent Mitos Magsaysay is term limited; she is running for the Senate; her son, Jesus Vicente II or Jobo, is her party's nominee. he will face outgoing olongapo city mayor James Gordon Jr. and former subic mayor Jeffrey Khonghun.

2nd District
Incumbent Jun Omar Ebdane succeeded Antonio M. Diaz in a special election when the latter died in 2011.

References

2013 Philippine general election
Lower house elections in Central Luzon